Thozhar Pandian is a 1994 Indian Tamil-language drama film, written and directed by Manivannan. It stars Sathyaraj and Ranjitha.

Cast 

 Sathyaraj as Pandian
 Ranjitha
 Napoleon as Shanmuganathan 
 Sujatha
 Manivannan
 Manobala
 Vijaya Bharathi (aka Bharathi)
 Raghuvaran
 Anandaraj
 Silk Smitha
 R. Sundarrajan
 Manivasagam
 Halwa Vasu
 S. N. Lakshmi
 C. R. Saraswathi
 Sabitha Anand
 Anusha
 Chelladurai
 Nellai Siva

Production
The film's title was named after Manivannan's friend known as 'Comrade' Pandian, a communist leader from Tamil Nadu.

Soundtrack  
Music was composed by Ilaiyaraaja. Lyrics were written by Vaali & Pulamaipithan.

References

External links 
 Thozhar Pandian at IMdB

1994 films
Films scored by Ilaiyaraaja
1990s Tamil-language films
Films directed by Manivannan